The Kerrygold International Classic was a men's golf tournament on the European Tour from 1975 to 1977. It was held at the Waterville Golf Links on the Ring of Kerry in County Kerry, Ireland.

The most notable of the three winners was former British and U.S. Open champion Tony Jacklin, with American George Burns and home professional Liam Higgins being the other two. Burns beat John Fowler at the second hole of a sudden-death playoff, making a par 4 after Fowler had taken a bogey 5.

Winners

References

External links
Coverage on the European Tour's official site

Former European Tour events
Golf tournaments in the Republic of Ireland
Sport in County Kerry
Golf in County Kerry
1970s in Irish sport